Family Matters is a television sitcom that premiered on September 22, 1989 on ABC, then moved to CBS for its final season which ended on July 17, 1998. A total of 215 episodes were produced spanning nine seasons.

Series overview

Episodes

Season 1 (1989–90)

Season 2 (1990–91)

Season 3 (1991–92)

Season 4 (1992–93)

Season 5 (1993–94)

Season 6 (1994–95)

Season 7 (1995–96)

Season 8 (1996–97)

Season 9 (1997–98)

References

External links

Episodes
Lists of American sitcom episodes